James Hathaway may refer to:

 Sergeant Hathaway, a character in Lewis, a British TV series
 James C. Hathaway (born 1956), authority on refugee law